The 2008 Qantas Film and Television Awards were held on Saturday 13 September 2008 at the Civic Theatre in Auckland. For the first time, the craft awards were presented separately to the rest of the awards, at an earlier luncheon ceremony at the Civic Wintergarden, Auckland, on Friday 12 September 2008.

Nominees and Winners 
Winners are listed first and highlighted in boldface.
Key
 – Non-technical award
 – Technical award

News and Current Affairs

Television

Film

References

External links 
 Kiwi TV – 2008 Qantas Film and Television Awards

New Zealand film awards
New Zealand television awards
Qantas Film and Television Awards
Awards
2000s in New Zealand cinema
Qantas